Lee Moon-jin (born 4 August 1995) is a South-Korean judoka.

He is the gold medallist of the 2019 Judo Grand Slam Abu Dhabi in the -82 kg category.

References

External links
 
 

1995 births
Living people
South Korean male judoka